Ethnikos Alexandroupoli F.C. is an association football club based in Alexandroupoli, a city in the Evros prefecture of northern Greece. It was established in 1927.

History
Ethnikos participated 7 times in the Beta Ethniki between 1963 and 1974, 8 times in the Gamma Ethniki between 1983 and 1994 and in the 1972 Greek Amateur Cup final as G.S. Alexandroupoli, where it lost against Fivos Kremasti at Karaiskaki Stadium.

In 1969, due to a law by the regime of the Colonels which ruled Greece at the time, Ethnikos was merged with Doxa Alexandroupoli to form G.S. Alexandroupoli. In 1973, Ethnikos re-established its football department and in 1995 it was merged with A.O. Alexandroupoli, a club formed by G.S. Alexandroupoli and Kyklopas Makris, to form Orfeas Alexandroupoli, which in 1999 it was renamed Enosi Thraki. In the same year, Ethnikos Alexandroupoli was re-established at the local Evros championships, where it currently plays.

See also
Ethnikos Alexandroupoli V.C.

References

Football clubs in Eastern Macedonia and Thrace
Association football clubs established in 1927
Association football clubs established in 1999
Alexandroupolis
1999 establishments in Greece